Condea emoryi (synonym Hyptis emoryi), the desert lavender, is a large, multi-stemmed shrub species of flowering plant in Lamiaceae, the mint family.

It is one of the favored plants of honeybees in early spring in the southwest deserts of North America.

Description 
Desert lavender is a medium to tall cold tender perennial shrub found in the southwestern United States in Arizona, Nevada, California, and northwestern Mexico in Sonora and Baja California.

It is a multi-stemmed shrub reaching 15–18 ft in optimum locations. It has violet-blue flowers up to 1 in, in leaf axils. The flowers are profuse along the main stem and side branches and is an aromatic attractor of the honeybee and other species. Leaves are oval and a whitish gray-green-(in deserts), serrated margins, hairy, and 2–3 in. It is found in dry washes, and on rocky slopes, up to 3000 ft (900 m). It is evergreen or cold deciduous, depending on location.

Taxonomy 
Hyptis was demonstrated to be polyphyletic on the basis of evidence from nuclear and plastid DNA. The new circumscription excluded Hyptis emoryi, which was transferred to Condea.

Distribution and habitat 
It occurs mostly in areas with a water source; in the southwestern US deserts it is commonly in the dry washes, intermixed with other species.

In the "creosote bush scrub" Yuma Desert-(western Sonoran Desert) of southwest Arizona, it is found with the palo verde, Bebbia, Encelia farinosa, desert ironwood (Olneya tesota), Lycium andersonii (wolfberry or Anderson thornbush), Psorothamnus spinosus (a type of smoke tree), and Acacia greggii, as some common associated species of the washes, elevation dependent.

In Arizona, found from central to southwestern Arizona of the Sonoran Desert; in northwest Arizona found in regions of the Mojave Desert. In southern California and Nevada, desert lavender is found in southern regions of the Mojave Desert and the Colorado Desert of southeast California.

References

External links 
Jepson Manual Treatment
USDA: NRCS: Plants Profile Hyptis emoryi; Arizona county range; California; Nevada

Lady Bird Johnson Wildflower Center – The University of Texas at Austin – Lady Bird Johnson–"Wildflower Center"
Photo-stems & flowers; Article – desert-tropicals.com–"Desert Tropicals"
Photo: Rocky wash: w/Bebbia-(dried), Brittlebush-in yellow bloom, and Saguaro on plain; Article, Synopsis, and photo gallery – delange.org—"Arizona Wild Flowers"

Lamiaceae
Flora of the Southwestern United States
Flora of Northwestern Mexico
North American desert flora